Rivière-aux-Brochets Ecological Reserve is an ecological reserve in Quebec, Canada. It was established on December 15, 1999. It is situated near the mouth of the Pike River in the Brome-Missisquoi Regional County Municipality of the Montérégie region of Quebec, Canada.  It is partially located in the municipality of Pike River and partially in Saint-Armand.

References

External links
 Official website from Government of Québec

Protected areas of Montérégie
Nature reserves in Quebec
Protected areas established in 1999
1999 establishments in Quebec
Brome-Missisquoi Regional County Municipality